The following is a list of WBU world champions, a table showing the world champions certificated by the World Boxing Union (WBU).

r – Champion relinquished title.
s – Champion stripped of title.

List of WBU Champions

Heavyweight

Cruiserweight

Light-Heavyweight

Super-Middleweight

Middleweight

Light-Middleweight

Welterweight

See also 
List of IBF world champions
List of WBA world champions
List of WBC world champions
List of WBO world champions

References

WBU
World Boxing Union